Fabian Velardes (born March 6, 1984 in La Calera, Córdoba Province) is a male middleweight boxer from Argentina. As an amateur Velardes competed for his native country at the 2003 Pan American Games in Santo Domingo, Dominican Republic, where he was stopped in the quarterfinals of the men's welterweight division (– 69 kg) by Cuba's eventual gold medalist Lorenzo Aragón. Velardes made his professional debut on February 5, 2005 against Alberto Gustavo Torres.

References

1984 births
Living people
Middleweight boxers
Boxers at the 2003 Pan American Games
Argentine male boxers
Pan American Games competitors for Argentina